Kerry B. Harvey (born February 26, 1957) is an American attorney who served as the United States Attorney for the Eastern District of Kentucky from 2010 to 2017. He was appointed as Secretary of the Kentucky Justice and Public Safety Cabinet in 2021.

References

1957 births
Living people
State cabinet secretaries of Kentucky
United States Attorneys for the Eastern District of Kentucky
Kentucky Democrats
Murray State University alumni
University of Kentucky College of Law alumni